Harry Francis Woods (born 23 December 1947) was an Australian politician. He was the member for Page, New South Wales in the Australian House of Representatives, representing the Australian Labor Party from the March 1990 general election to his defeat in the March 1996 general election by the National Party's Ian Causley, who was the New Wales South State member for Clarence when he resigned to contest Page.

Woods was elected as the Member for Clarence in the New South Wales Legislative Assembly for the Labor Party in May 1996 in the by-election that was triggered by Causley's resignation. He was only the second Labor member to win Clarence since its creation in 1859. He was Minister for Regional Development and Minister for Rural Affairs from 1997 to 1999 and Minister for Local Government, Minister for Regional Development and Minister for Rural Affairs from 1999 to his retirement in the 2003 election.

References

 

1947 births
Living people
Australian Labor Party members of the Parliament of Australia
Members of the Australian House of Representatives
Members of the Australian House of Representatives for Page
Members of the New South Wales Legislative Assembly